The Boise State Broncos are the intercollegiate athletic teams that represent Boise State University, located in Boise, Idaho. The Broncos compete at the National Collegiate Athletic Association (NCAA) Division I level as a member of the Mountain West Conference (MW). Boise State joined the MW on July 1, 2011.

Boise State's best-known program is football, which attained a perfect 13–0 record in 2006, capped by an overtime win in the Fiesta Bowl over the Oklahoma Sooners. They finished the season as the only major undefeated college football team. BSU's football team has won the Fiesta Bowl two more times, following the 2009 and 2014 seasons. The school's Albertsons Stadium introduced its famous blue artificial turf (now FieldTurf)  in 1986.

Other notable programs at BSU include the nationally ranked women's gymnastics team, which competes in the Mountain Rim Gymnastics Conference, the men's and women's basketball team, and the tennis teams which have consistently had nationally ranked players.

Conference affiliations
 Mountain West (MW) – joined 2011 (current)
 Western Athletic (WAC) – joined 2001
 Big West – joined 1996
 Big Sky – joined 1970

Teams sponsored
Boise State University sponsors teams in seven men's and eleven women's NCAA sanctioned sports, primarily competing in the Mountain West Conference, with the beach volleyball program competing in the Southland Conference, men's indoor track competing in the Mountain Pacific Sports Federation, and gymnastics in the Mountain Rim Gymnastics Conference.

Varsity sports

Football

The Boise State Broncos Football program represents Boise State University in college football and compete in the Football Bowl Subdivision (FBS) of Division I as a member of the Mountain West Conference. They are led by head coach Andy Avalos, and play their home games at Albertsons Stadium.

Basketball
The Boise State Broncos Basketball program represents Boise State University in college basketball and compete in the NCAA Division 1 as a member of the Mountain West Conference. They are led by coach Leon Rice, and play their home games at ExtraMile Arena.

Soccer
The 2009 women's soccer team participated in the first round of the NCAA Women's Soccer Championship tournament. Boise State was eliminated in the first round, losing to host UCLA 7–1 on Friday, November 13.

Tennis

Former varsity sports

Baseball
Boise State played intercollegiate baseball through the 1980 season. Their first season in the Big Sky Conference was 1971, with all eight teams split into two divisions and a best-of-three series between the division winners to determine the conference title. The Broncos and fellow newcomer Northern Arizona joined Idaho State and Weber State in the Southern Division. Montana State dropped the sport after the season and Montana in 1972, so Boise State was moved to the Northern Division for 1973 with Idaho and Gonzaga. After the season, athletic director Lyle Smith stepped down as head baseball coach, succeeded by Ross Vaughn, an assistant coach at Washington State in Pullman pursuing a doctorate in biomechanics.

Following the 1974 season, the Big Sky discontinued its sponsorship of baseball (and four other sports); Southern Division champion Idaho State dropped their program a few weeks later, and three-time conference champion Weber State soon followed. The three Northern Division teams joined the newly formed Northern Pacific Conference (NorPac) for the 1975 season and competed against Portland State, Portland, Seattle U., and Puget Sound (and later, Eastern Washington). Due to budget constraints, both BSU and Idaho discontinued baseball following the 1980 season. Head coach Vaughn stayed with the university another three decades as a kinesiology professor and an associate dean.

Boise State played on campus through the 1979 season, until displaced due to construction of the BSU Pavilion (now ExtraMile Arena). For their last season in 1980, the Broncos played home games at Borah Field (now Bill Wigle Field) at Borah High School.

With the elimination of wrestling in 2017, the baseball program returned in 2019 for the 2020 season; a coaching search began in September 2017, and Gary Van Tol was hired as head coach  However, that season was canceled after the COVID-19 pandemic was declared leading to baseball's second elimination when the athletic department's budget was reduced by $3 million. Most of the remaining players moved to other Bronco programs or transferred to Pac-12 Conference schools.

Wrestling
In 1999, as an assistant coach for the Broncos, Greg Randall helped guide Kirk White to the 165-pound national title. In his 14 seasons as head coach, Gregg Randall's teams have finished in the top-three at the conference tournament 10 times. In 1988, BSU wrestling joined the Pac-10 Conference.  Randall has led the Broncos to the top of the Pac-12 Conference four times, to go along with seven top-25 finishes at the NCAA Championships including a 9th-place finish at the 2010–11 NCAA Championships.  In 2006 Randall guided his first individual NCAA Champion as a head coach with Ben Cherrington capturing the national title in the 157-pound weight class. Cherrington was the second wrestler Randall has helped to a first-place finish at the NCAA tournament. Cherrington completed his season undefeated at 20–0 and won the 157-pound title at the NCAA National Championships. Cherrington's NCAA victory marked the second time in Boise State history a Bronco has own an individual national collegiate wrestling title. Boise State Wrestling competes at home in the Bronco's Gym or the ExtraMile Arena, both located on campus. After the 2016 season, Randall was replaced by former CSU Bakersfield wrestler and coach Mike Mendoza after a 9-26-1 record over the previous three seasons.

In April 2017, after a 2–9 season and an 11-35-1 record over four years, Boise State announced they would eliminate their wrestling program. The school also cited a desire to closer align itself with the Mountain West (which does not sponsor wrestling), a $350,000 loss during the 2016–17 season, and a plan to resurrect the school's baseball program.

Boise State Broncos Wrestling achievements: 
 16 total conference Championships
 Pac-12 Conference Champions: 2000, 2002, 2004, 2008, 2009, 2011
 20 individual All-Americans 
 12 top-20 NCAA team finishes & 5 top-10 NCAA team finishes
 2 individual NCAA Champions: Ben Cherrington 157lbs(2006) & Kirk White 165lbs(1999)

National Championships

NCAA team championships

Boise State has won one NCAA team national championship.

Men's (1)
Football : 1980 (Division I-AA)

NJCAA team championships
Boise Junior College won one NJCAA team national championship.

Men's (1)
Football : 1958 (NJCAA)

Unclaimed national championships
The 2006 and 2009 BSU football teams were both named national champions for their undefeated seasons and wins in the Fiesta Bowl by the Nevada Dental Association

Men's (2)
Football : 2006
Football : 2009

Individual national championships
Men's Skiing (Slalom): Bill Shaw, 1974
Men's Track & Field (High Jump): Jake Jacoby, 1984
Men's Track & Field (Triple Jump): Eugene Green, 1991
Wrestling (165 lbs.): Kirk White, 1999
Men's Track & Field (Javelin): Gabe Wallin, 2004
Men's Track & Field (Javelin): Gabe Wallin, 2005
Wrestling (157 lbs.): Ben Cherrington, 2006
Women's Track & Field (Long Jump): Eleni Kafourou, 2009
Men's Track & Field (Decathlon): Kurt Felix, 2012
Women's Track & Field (10,000 meters) : Emma Bates, 2014
Women's Track & Field (Steeplechase) : Allie Ostrander, 2017
Women's Track & Field (Steeplechase) : Allie Ostrander, 2018

Athletic staff

Athletic directors

Current head coaches

(as of August 2017)

Hall of Fame 
College Football Hall of Fame
Randy Trautman – DT, 1978–1981

References

External links 
 

 
Baseball teams disestablished in 1980